Collar tie is a grappling clinch hold that is used to control the opponent. It is performed from the front of the opponent by grabbing the opponent by the collar, behind the neck, or behind the trapezius muscle. A collar tie using one hand is called a single collar tie, and a collar tie with both hands is called a double collar tie.

See also
 Clinch fighting

Notes

References
 Hewitson, Nick. The Sophistication of the Muay Thai Clinch. Fighttimes.com. URL last accessed July 13, 2008.
 Pedreira, Roberto. The Subtle Science of the Muay Thai Clinch. last accessed July 13, 2008.

Grappling positions
Grappling
Grappling hold
Wrestling